Batoul S'Himi (born 1974 in Asilah, Morocco) is a sculptor whose work often comments on gender inequality and the global struggle for social change. She is best known for her series World Under Pressure in which she created sculptures from pressure cookers and other domestic tools and appliances. These works comment on international concerns such as growing environmental pressures. S'Himi's work is included in the Smithsonian permanent collection.

Exhibitions 
Her work has been displayed in exhibitions across the world, such as:

References

Living people
1974 births
Moroccan artists
Moroccan women sculptors